Burden of Proof is the sixth album by the Canterbury associated band Soft Machine Legacy and their third studio album, released on CD in March 2013. This was the last album to use the "Legacy" suffix before it was dropped in 2015. Soft Machine returned with Hidden Details in 2018 featuring the same line-up that recorded this album.

Track listing
 "Burden of Proof" (5:51) (John Etheridge)
 "Voyage Beyond Seven" (4:53) (Theo Travis)
 "Kitto" (1:50) (John Etheridge)
 "Pie Chart" (5:07) (John Etheridge)
 "JSP" (1:03) (John Marshall)
 "Kings & Queens" (6:46) (Hugh Hopper)
 "Fallout" (6:59) (Theo Travis)
 "Going Somewhere Canorous?" (1:13) (Roy Babbington, John Marshall)
 "Black and Crimson" (5:05) (Theo Travis)
 "The Brief" (2:27) (John Marshall, Theo Travis)
 "Pump Room" (5:19) (John Etheridge)
 "Green Cubes" (5:33) (Roy Babbington, John Etheridge, John Marshall, Theo Travis)
 "They Landed on a Hill" (3:03) (John Etheridge, Theo Travis)

Personnel
 Theo Travis – tenor sax, flute, Fender Rhodes electric piano
 John Etheridge – guitar
 Roy Babbington – bass guitar
 John Marshall – drums, percussion

Credits 
 Recorded by Beppe Crovella, at Electromantic Synergy Studio, San Sabastiano da Po, Italy; August 2012.
 Mixed and mastered by Andrew Tulloch, at The Blue Room, London; December 2012 through January 2013.
 Produced by Soft Machine Legacy.
 Executive Producer: Leonardo Pavkovic.

References

External links

2013 albums
Soft Machine Legacy albums